Monarchs ruled the Kingdom of France from the establishment of Francia in 509 to 1870, except for certain periods from 1792 to 1852. Since 1870, the head of state has been the President of France. Below is a list of all French heads of state. It includes the monarchs of the Kingdom of France, emperors of the First and Second Empire and leaders of the five Republics.

Merovingian dynasty (509–751)
The Merovingians were a Salian Frankish dynasty that ruled the Franks for nearly 300 years in a region known as Francia in Latin, beginning in the middle of the 5th century CE. Their territory largely corresponded to ancient Gaul as well as the Roman provinces of Raetia, Germania Superior and the southern part of Germania. The Merovingian dynasty was founded by Childeric I (c. 457481 CE), the son of Merovech, leader of the Salian Franks, but it was his famous son Clovis I (481–511 CE) who united all of Gaul under Merovingian rule.

The last Merovingian kings, known as the "lazy kings" (rois fainéants), did not hold any real political power, while the Mayor of the Palace governed instead. When Theuderic IV died in 737, Mayor of the Palace Charles Martel left the throne vacant and continued to rule until his own death in 741. His sons Pepin and Carloman briefly restored the Merovingian dynasty by raising Childeric III to the throne in 743. In 751, Pepin deposed Childerich and acceded to the throne.

Carolingian dynasty (751–888)
The Carolingian dynasty was a Frankish noble family with origins in the Arnulfing and Pippinid clans of the 7th century AD. The family consolidated its power in the late 8th century, eventually making the offices of Mayor of the Palace and dux et princeps Francorum hereditary and becoming the de facto rulers of the Franks as the real powers behind the throne. By 751, the Merovingian dynasty, which until then had ruled the Germanic Franks by right, was deprived of this right with the consent of the Papacy and the aristocracy, and a Carolingian, Pepin the Short, was crowned King of the Franks.
<onlyinclude>

Robertian dynasty (888–898)

The Robertians were Frankish noblemen owing fealty to the Carolingians, and ancestors of the subsequent Capetian dynasty. Odo, Count of Paris was chosen by the western Franks to be their king following the removal of emperor Charles the Fat. He was crowned at Compiègne in February 888 by Walter, Archbishop of Sens.

Carolingian dynasty (893–922)
Charles, the posthumous son of Louis II, was crowned by a faction opposed to the Robertian Odo at Reims Cathedral, though he only became the effectual monarch with the death of Odo in 898.

Robertian dynasty (922–923)

Bosonid dynasty (923–936)

The Bosonids were a noble family descended from Boso the Elder, their member, Rudolph (Raoul), was elected "King of the Franks" in 923.

Carolingian dynasty (936–987)

Capetian dynasty (987–1792)

After the death of Louis V, the son of Hugh the Great and grandson of Robert I, Hugh Capet, was elected by the nobility as king of France. The Capetian Dynasty, the male-line descendants of Hugh Capet, ruled France continuously from 987 to 1792 and again from 1814 to 1848. They were direct descendants of the Robertian kings. The cadet branches of the dynasty which ruled after 1328, however, are generally given the specific branch names of Valois and Bourbon.

Not listed below are Hugh Magnus, eldest son of Robert II, and Philip of France, eldest son of Louis VI; both were co-Kings with their fathers (in accordance with the early Capetian practice whereby kings would crown their heirs in their own lifetimes and share power with the co-king), but predeceased them. Because neither Hugh nor Philip were sole or senior king in their own lifetimes, they are not traditionally listed as Kings of France, and are not given ordinals.

Henry VI of England, son of Catherine of Valois, became titular King of France upon his grandfather Charles VI's death in accordance with the Treaty of Troyes of 1420 however this was disputed and he is not always regarded as a legitimate king of France.

From 21 January 1793 to 8 June 1795, Louis XVI's son Louis-Charles was the titular King of France as Louis XVII; in reality, however, he was imprisoned in the Temple throughout this duration, and power was held by the leaders of the Republic. Upon Louis XVII's death, his uncle (Louis XVI's brother) Louis-Stanislas claimed the throne, as Louis XVIII, but only became de facto King of France in 1814.

House of Capet (987–1328)

House of Valois (1328–1589)

House of Lancaster (1422–1453), disputed

From 1340 to 1801 (but not from 1360 to 1369), the Kings of England and Great Britain claimed the title of King of France. Under the terms of the 1420 Treaty of Troyes, Charles VI had recognized his son-in-law Henry V of England as regent and heir. Henry V predeceased Charles VI and so Henry V's son, Henry VI, succeeded his grandfather Charles VI as King of France. Most of Northern France was under English control until 1435, but by 1453, the English had been expelled from all of France save Calais (and the Channel Islands), and Calais itself fell in 1558. Nevertheless, English and then British monarchs continued to claim the title for themselves until the creation of the United Kingdom in 1801.

House of Valois (1328–1589)

Orléans branch (1498–1515)

Orléans–Angoulême Branch (1515–1589)

House of Bourbon (1589–1792)

French First Republic (1792–1804)

Presidents of the National Convention

The first President of France is considered to be Louis-Napoléon Bonaparte (later Napoleon III), who was elected in the 1848 election, under the French Second Republic.

From 22 September 1792 to 2 November 1795, the French Republic was governed by the National Convention, whose president (elected from within for a 14-day term) may be considered as France's legitimate Head of State during this period. Historians generally divide the Convention's activities into three periods, moderate, radical, and reaction, and the policies of presidents of the Convention reflect these distinctions. During the radical and reaction phases, some of the presidents were executed, most by guillotine, committed suicide, or were deported. In addition, some of the presidents were later deported during the Bourbon Restoration in 1815.

Establishment of the Convention
The National Convention governed France from 20 September 1792 until 26 October 1795 during the most critical period of the French Revolution. The election of the National Convention took place in September 1792 after the election of the electoral colleges by primary regional assemblies on 26 August. Owing to the abstention of aristocrats and the anti-republicans, and the general fear of victimization, the voter turnout in the departments was low – as little as 7.5 percent or as much as 11.9% of the electorate, compared to 10.2% in the 1791 elections, despite the doubling of the number of eligible voters.

Initially elected to provide a new constitution after the overthrow of the monarchy on 10 August 1792, the Convention included 749 deputies drawn from businesses and trades, and from such professions as law, journalism, medicine, and the clergy. Among its earliest acts was the formal abolition of the monarchy, through Proclamation, on 21 September, and the subsequent establishment of the Republic on 22 September. The French Republican Calendar discarded all Christian reference points and calculated time from the Republic's first full day after the monarchy – 22 September 1792, the first day of Year One.

According to its own rules, the Convention elected its President every fortnight (two weeks). He was eligible for re-election after the lapse of a fortnight. Ordinarily the sessions were held in the morning, but evening sessions also occurred frequently, often extending late into the night. In exceptional circumstances, the Convention declared itself in permanent session and sat for several days without interruption. For both legislative and administrative deliberations, the Convention used committees, with powers more or less widely extended and regulated by successive laws. The most famous of these committees included the Committee of Public Safety and the Committee of General Security.

The Convention held both legislative and executive powers during the first years of the French First Republic and had three distinct periods: Girondins (moderate), Montagnard (radical) and Thermidorian (reaction).  The Montagnards favored granting the poorer classes more political power; the Girondins favored a bourgeois republic and wanted to reduce the power and influence of Paris over the course of the revolution.  A popular uprising in Paris helped to purge the Convention of the Girondins between 31 May and 2 June 1793;  the last of the Girondins served as presidents in late July.

In its second phase, the Montagnards controlled the convention (June 1793 to July 1794). War and an internal rebellion convinced the revolutionary government to establish a Committee of Public Safety which exercised near dictatorial power. Consequently, the democratic constitution, approved by the convention on 24 June 1793, did not go into effect and the Convention lost its legislative initiative. The rise of Mountaineers (Montagnards) corresponded with the decline of the Girondins. The Girondin party had hesitated on the correct course of action to take with Louis XVI after his attempt to flee France on 20 June 1791. Some elements of the Girondin party believed they could use the king as figurehead. While the Girondins hesitated, the Montagnards took a united stand during the trial in December 1792 – January 1793 and favored the king's execution. Riding on this victory, the Montagnards then sought to discredit the Girondins using tactics previously used against themselves, denouncing the Girondins as liars and enemies of the Revolution. The last quarter of the year was marked by the Reign of Terror (5 September 1793 – 28 July 1794), also known as The Terror, a period of violence incited by conflict between these rival political factions, the Girondins and the Jacobins, and marked by mass executions of "enemies of the revolution". The death toll ranged in the tens of thousands, with 16,594 executed by guillotine (2,639 in Paris), and another 25,000 in summary executions across France.  Most of the Parisian victims of the guillotine filled the Madeleine, Mosseaux (also called Errancis), and Picpus cemeteries.

In the third phase, called Thermidor after the month in which it began, many of the members of the Convention overthrew the most prominent member of the committee, Maximilien Robespierre.  This reaction to the radical influence of the Committee of Public Safety reestablished the balance of power in the hands of the moderate deputies.  The Girondins who had survived the 1793 purge were recalled and the leading Montagnards were themselves purged, and many executed.  In August 1795, the Convention approved the Constitution for the regime that replaced it, the bourgeois-dominated Directory, which exercised power from 1795 to 1799, when a coup d'etat by Napoleon Bonaparte overthrew it.

Moderate Phase: September 1792 – June 1793

Initially, La Marais, or The Plain, a moderate, amorphous group, controlled the Convention.  At the first session, held on 20 September 1792, the elder statesman Philippe Rühl presided over the session. The following day, amidst profound silence, the proposition was put to the assembly, "That royalty be abolished in France"; it carried, with cheers. On the 22nd came the news of the Republic's victory at the Battle of Valmy. On the same day, the Convention decreed that "in future, the acts of the assembly shall be dated First Year of the French Republic". Three days later, the Convention added the corollary of "the French republic is one and indivisible", to guard against federalism.

The following men were elected for two-week terms as Presidents, or executives, of the Convention.

At the end of May 1793, an uprising of the Parisian sans culottes, the day-laborers and working class, undermined much of the authority of the moderate Girondins.  At this point, although Danton and Hérault de Séchelles both served one more term each as Presidents of the Convention, the Girondins had lost control of the Convention: in June and July compromise after compromise changed the course of the revolution from a bourgeois event to a radical, working class event. Price controls were introduced and a minimum wage guaranteed to workers and soldiers. Over the course of the summer, the government became truly revolutionary.

Radical phase: June 1793 – July 1794

After the insurrection, any attempted resistance to revolutionary ideals was crushed. The insurrection of 31 May – 2 June 1793 marked a significant milestone in the history of the French Revolution. The days of 31 May – 2 June resulted in the fall of the Girondin party under pressure of the Parisian sans-culottes, Jacobins of the clubs, and Montagnards in the National Convention. The following men were elected as presidents of the Convention during its transition from its moderate to radical phase.

After 1793, President of the National Convention became a puppet office under the Committee of Public Safety
The following men were elected as presidents of the Convention during its radical phase.

Reaction: July 1794–1795

In 1794, Maximilien Robespierre continued to consolidate his power over the Montagnards with the use of the Committee of Public Safety.   By late spring, the moderate members of the Convention had had enough.  They began to conspire secretly against Robespierre and his allies. The Thermidorian Reaction was a revolt within the Convention against the leadership of the Jacobin Club over the Committee of Public Safety. The National Convention voted to remove Maximilien Robespierre, Louis Antoine de Saint-Just, and several other leading members of the revolutionary government, and they were executed the following day. This ended the most radical phase of the French Revolution.

The following men were Presidents of the Convention until its end.

Presidents of the Committee of Public Safety
Political parties

Successor organization

The Directory

The Directory was the government of France following the collapse of the National Convention in late 1795.  Administered by a collective leadership of five directors, it preceded the Consulate established in a coup d'etat by Napoleon. It lasted from 2 November 1795 until 10 November 1799, a period commonly known as the "Directory era". The directory operated with a bicameral structure. A Council of the Ancients, selected by lot, named the directors. For its own security, the Left (whose members dominated the Council) resolved that all five must be old members of the Convention and regicides who had voted to execute King Louis XVI. The Ancients chose Jean-François Rewbell; Paul François Jean Nicolas, vicomte de Barras; Louis Marie de La Révellière-Lépeaux; Lazare Nicolas Marguerite Carnot; and Étienne-François Le Tourneur.

The Directory was officially led by a president, as stipulated by Article 141 of the Constitution of the Year III. An entirely ceremonial post, the first president was Rewbell who was chosen by lot on 2 November 1795. The directors conducted their elections privately, with the presidency rotating every three months. The last president was Gohier.

The key figure of the Directory was Paul Barras, the only Director to serve throughout the Directory.

The Consulate

House of Bonaparte, First Empire (1804–1814)

Napoleon Bonaparte became Emperor in 1804 following a referendum. He received the title Emperor of the French to differentiate himself from the previous monarchs. His rule saw the domination of France as it crushed the Prussians, Russians, Austrians and British alike. Napoleon's rule lasted from 1804 to 1814 when after many coalitions against him he was defeated by the combined might of the other powers of Europe. He would then be exiled to the Island of Elba off the coast of Italy. However he was given the island to run as the Emperor of Elba.

Capetian Dynasty (1814–1815)

House of Bourbon, Bourbon Restoration (1814–1815)

House of Bonaparte, First Empire (Hundred Days, 1815)

Capetian Dynasty (1815–1848)

House of Bourbon (1815–1830)

Revolution of 1830
For a few days during the July Revolution, Gilbert du Motier, Marquis de Lafayette held executive power and was offered the presidency of a Republic. He refused.

Louis XIX was technically king for 20 minutes on 2 August 1830, and his nephew Henri V for ten days after that.

House of Orléans, July Monarchy (1830–1848)

French Second Republic (1848–1852)

De facto heads of state of regimes of 1848
Political parties

President of the Republic
Political parties

House of Bonaparte, Second Empire (1852–1870)

French Third Republic (1870–1940)

President of the Government of National Defense
Louis Jules Trochu (4 September 1870 – 13 February 1871)

Chief of the Executive Power
Adolphe Thiers (17 February 1871 – 30 August 1871), became President on 31 August 1871

Presidents of the Republic
Political parties

Acting Presidents
Under the Third Republic, the President of the Council served as acting president whenever the office of president was vacant.

Jules Armand Dufaure (30 January 1879)
Maurice Rouvier (2–3 December 1887)
Charles Dupuy (25–27 June 1894, 16–17 January 1895 and 16–18 February 1899)
Alexandre Millerand (21–23 September 1920)
Frédéric François-Marsal (11–13 June 1924)
André Tardieu (7–10 May 1932)

The office of President of the French Republic did not exist from 1940 until 1947.

French State (1940–1944)

Chief of State

Provisional Government of the French Republic (1944–1947)

French Fourth Republic (1947–1958)

Presidents
Political parties:

Fifth French Republic (1958–present)

Presidents
Political parties:

Later pretenders
Various pretenders descended from the preceding monarchs have claimed to be the legitimate monarch of France, rejecting the claims of the President of France, and of each other. These groups are:
 Legitimist claimants to the throne of France: descendants of the Bourbons, rejecting all heads of state 1792–1814, 1815, and since 1830. Unionists recognized the Orléanist claimant after 1883.
 Legitimist-Anjou claimants to the throne of France: descendants of Louis XIV, claiming precedence over the House of Orléans by virtue of primogeniture
 Orléanist claimants to the throne of France: descendants of Louis-Phillippe, himself descended from a junior line of the Bourbon dynasty, rejecting all heads of state since 1848.
 Bonapartist claimants to the throne of France: descendants of Napoleon I and his brothers, rejecting all heads of state 1815–48, and since 1870.
 English claimants to the throne of France: Kings of England and later, of Great Britain (renounced by Hanoverian King George III upon union with Ireland)
 Jacobite claimants to the throne of France: senior heirs-general of King Edward III of England and thus his claim to the French throne, also claiming England, Scotland, and Ireland.

Timeline

See also 
List of French monarchs
List of presidents of the National Convention
List of presidents of France
Ministers of the French National Convention
Representative on mission
 Full list of members of the Convention per department: List of members of the National Convention by Department (French)
List of foreign ministers of France
List of prime ministers of France
President of France
British claims to the French throne
Kings of France family tree
Style of the French sovereign

Notes, citations and sources

Notes

References

Sources 

 Alderson, Robert. This Bright Era of Happy Revolutions: French Consul.  U. of South Carolina Press, 2008. 
 
 Doyle, William. The Oxford History of the French Revolution. 2nd edition. Oxford University Press, 2002.  
 Cheynet, Pierre-Dominique. France: Members of the Executive Directory: 1792–1793, and 1793–1795. Archontology.org 2013, Accessed 19 February 2015.
  Dupuy, Roger. La République jacobine. Terreur, guerre et gouvernement révolutionnaire (1792—1794). Paris, Le Seuil, 2005.  
 Furet, François. The French Revolution: 1770–1814. Oxford, Blackwell Publishers Ltd, 1996.  
 Fleischmann, Hector, Behind the Scenes in the Terror, NY, Brentano's, 1915.  
 Garnier, Jean-Claude; Jean-Pierre Mohen. Cimetières autour du monde: Un désir d'éternité. Paris, Editions Errance. 2003.  
 Greer, Donald. The Incidence of the Terror during the French Revolution: A Statistical Interpretation. Cambridge (United States C.A), Harvard University Press, 1951. 
 Linton, Marisa. Choosing Terror: Virtue, Friendship, and Authenticity in the French Revolution Oxford U.P., 2013. 
 Neeley, Sylvia.  A Concise History of the French Revolution, Lanham, Rowman & Littlefield, 2008. 
 Popkin, Jeremy D.  A Short History of the French Revolution. 5th ed. Upper Saddle River, Pearson, 2009. 
 Smitha, Frank E. Macrohistory: Fear, Overreaction and War (1792–93). 2009–2015 version. Accessed 21 April 2015.
 Thompson, J.M. The French Revolution. Oxford, Basil Blackwell, 1959. 

 
France
Heads of state of France
Presidents
France